Selzer is a surname. Notable people with this surname include:
 Ann Selzer, American political pollster
 Clemens Selzer,  Austrian track cyclist
 Edward Selzer, American cartoon producer
 Ken Selzer, American politician
 Milton Selzer, American actor
 Peter Selzer, former German race walker
 Richard Selzer, American surgeon

See also
 Seltzer (disambiguation)
 Sälzer
 Zeltser, a surname